John Sidney Smith (1804–1871) was a legal writer.

John Sidney Smith, son of John Spry Smith of 9 Woburn Square, London, was born in 1804, and held a situation in the six clerks' office in the court of chancery until 23 Oct. 1842, when the establishment was abolished. He soon after entered Trinity Hall, Cambridge, and graduated B.A. 1847 and M.A. 1850. He was called to the bar at the Middle Temple on 7 Nov. 1845, and practised in the Court of Chancery.

He died at Sidney Lodge, Wimbledon, Surrey, on 14 Jan. 1871.

Publications
A Treatise on the Practice of the Court of Chancery, 2 vols, 1834–35. (7th edition, with Alfred Smith, 1862; American edition, Philadelphia, 1839)
A Handbook of the Practice of the Court of Chancery, 1848 (2nd edit. 1855)
A Treatise on the Principles of Equity, 1856.

References

Attribution
 

1804 births
1871 deaths
Alumni of Trinity Hall, Cambridge
Members of the Middle Temple
English legal writers
19th-century English people
English male non-fiction writers